KKHT-FM (100.7 MHz "100.7 The Word") is a commercial FM radio station licensed to Lumberton, Texas, and serving Greater Houston as well as the Golden Triangle.  It is owned by Salem Media of Illinois, LLC, a subsidiary of the Salem Media Group, and it airs a Christian talk and teaching radio format.  Studios and offices are in the Sharpstown district in Southwest Houston.

KKHT-FM has an effective radiated power (ERP) of 100,000 watts, the highest permitted for non-grandfathered FM stations in the U.S.  The transmitter is off of U.S. Route 90 in Devers, Texas.

Programming
National religious leaders heard on KKHT-FM include Charles Stanley, David Jeremiah, Rick Warren, Jim Daly and Adrian Rogers.  Several Houston-area ministers are also heard on KKHT-FM.  National news is supplied from SRN News.  The station uses a brokered programming system where hosts buy time on the schedule and may use their programs to seek donations to their ministries.

History
On December 1, 1987, the station signed on the air at 100.9 MHz, as a Class A facility. The original call sign was KJAS, representing Jasper, Texas, its original city of license.  The station had a country music format and was owned by Jasper County Broadcasting.  The power was only 5,100 watts, a fraction of its current output.

In 1996, the station was sold to Tichenor Broadcasting for $3.5 million.  Tichenor specialized in formats targeting Hispanic listeners.  The station also got permission from the Federal Communications Commission (FCC) to move down the dial to 100.7 MHz and greatly increase power to 100,000 watts.  The call letters switched to KRTX and the city of license became Winnie, Texas.  Tichenor gave the newly-powerful station a Regional Mexican format, aimed at Spanish-speaking listeners in and around Houston, one of America's largest Latino media markets.  Tichenor was later acquired by Univision Communications.

In 2004, this station was traded from Univision to the Salem Media Group in a deal involving six other stations in five U.S. cities. (See the WPPN page for details.)  At the time of sale, 100.7 played Spanish-language contemporary hits as KOBT "Orbita 100-7".  Once Salem acquired KOBT, it switched the station to Christian talk and teaching, using the moniker "The Word."  Co-owned 1070 KNTH had previously carried the Christian format and was called "The Word."  With the FM station now known as "100.7 The Word," Salem launched a new format on AM 1070.  KNTH flipped to a conservative talk format as "AM 1070 KNTH", standing for News Talk Houston.

Call sign history
KJAS - 1/15/1987
KRTX - 8/16/1996
KRTX-FM - 3/21/1997
KOVE-FM - 11/21/1997
KRTX-FM - 6/25/1998
KLAT-FM - 3/28/2002
KOBT - 12/4/2002
KKHT-FM - 11/8/2004

References

External links

KHT
Radio stations established in 1987
Salem Media Group properties